Mathieu Berson (born 23 February 1980) is a French former footballer who until 2013 played as a midfielder. Berson played for Nantes, Aston Villa, Auxerre, Levante, Toulouse, and Vannes.

Career
Berson began his career with Nantes and made his senior debut during the 1999–2000 season, going on to start in the victorious 2000 Coupe de France Final. The following campaign, Nantes were crowned champions of France for the eight time, with Berson making 29 league appearances. He also played as Nantes won the 2001 Trophée des Champions. Having featured for the club consistently over a four-year period, he was transferred to Premier League club Aston Villa in the summer of 2004. In January 2005, Villa signed Eric Djemba-Djemba in an attempt to replicate the successful partnership they had formed at Nantes, where they played 50 games together. However, six months later, Berson was back in France, having joined Auxerre on a season-long loan. In the summer of 2006, he was transferred to La Liga side Levante. He played regularly for the next two seasons before returning to France with Toulouse in 2008. Released by Toulouse in the summer of 2010 due to budget cuts, Berson remained without a club until signing a two-year contract with Vannes in June 2011.

References

External links

Levante profile

1980 births
Living people
Sportspeople from Vannes
Association football midfielders
French footballers
France under-21 international footballers
FC Nantes players
Aston Villa F.C. players
AJ Auxerre players
Levante UD footballers
Toulouse FC players
Vannes OC players
Ligue 1 players
Premier League players
La Liga players
Championnat National players
Expatriate footballers in Spain
Expatriate footballers in England
French expatriate footballers
Footballers from Brittany